Seling is a town in Aizawl district, Mizoram, India.

Geography

Location
National Highway 150 starts from Seling. The town is located some 45 kilometers away from the capital city Aizawl.

References

External links
 About Seling

Cities and towns in Aizawl district